Doug Datish (born August 1, 1983) is a former American football center. He was drafted by the Atlanta Falcons in the sixth round of the 2007 NFL Draft. He played college football at Ohio State.

Datish was also a member of the Indianapolis Colts.

Early years
Datish was a standout player on both offense and defense at Howland High School. As a senior, he was selected as the Associated Press Division II Co-Defensive player of the year and was first-team All-Ohio. He was ranked as the fifth-best offensive lineman in the country by SuperPrep. He and his wife, Karli, reside in Warren, Ohio.

References

External links
 Tennessee Titans bio

1983 births
Living people
American football centers
American football offensive guards
Atlanta Falcons players
Indianapolis Colts players
Ohio State Buckeyes football players
Tennessee Titans players
Sportspeople from Warren, Ohio
Players of American football from Ohio